Fernanda Hin Lin Ly is an Australian fashion model. She is best known for her pink hair.

Early life 
Ly is of Chinese-Vietnamese descent.

Career 
Ly was discovered at a mall and debuted as a Louis Vuitton exclusive, gaining overnight attention for her pink hair. Before modelling, Ly studied architecture.

Ly has been on the cover of Vogue Australia, Teen Vogue, and Vogue Italia.

In 2017, she appeared in two ad campaigns for Kate Spade New York. She has also been in advertisements for Chanel Beauty, American Eagle Outfitters, Forever 21, Dior, Tiffany & Co., Gap Inc., Louis Vuitton, and H&M.

In addition to her modelling career, Ly runs a YouTube channel called Ferntube (stylised in all caps), which has been active since 2020.

References 

Living people
1990s births
Australian female models
Australian models of Chinese descent
Louis Vuitton exclusive models